Calcium/calmodulin-dependent protein kinase type II subunit alpha (CAMKIIα),   protein kinase , is one subunit of CamKII, a protein kinase (i.e., an enzyme which phosphorylates proteins) that in humans is encoded by the CAMK2A gene.

Function 

The product of the CAMK2A gene is an enzyme that belongs to the serine/threonine-specific protein kinase family, as well as the Ca2+/calmodulin-dependent protein kinase II subfamily. Ca2+ signaling is crucial for several aspects of synaptic plasticity at glutamatergic synapses. This enzyme is composed of four different chains: alpha, beta, gamma, and delta. The alpha chain encoded by this gene is required for hippocampal long-term potentiation (LTP) and spatial learning. In addition to its calcium-calmodulin (CaM)-dependent activity, this protein can undergo autophosphorylation, resulting in CaM-independent activity. Two transcript variants encoding distinct isoforms have been identified for this gene. According to a 2018 study by Bruno Reversade, the recessive mutation of CAMK2A in humans cause a syndrome of severe intellectual disability with growth retardation.

Interactions 

CAMK2A has been shown to interact with:
 Actinin alpha 4, 
 CDK5R1, and
 DLG1.

References

Further reading

External links 
 

EC 2.7.11